Scott Mead is an American fine art photographer, philanthropist, and investor currently based in London. After an early career in photography, Mead relocated to London in 1988, where as a partner at Goldman Sachs, he became known for overseeing and negotiating large telecommunications and technology mergers. In 2000 he was chief advisor on Vodafone's $200 billion buyout of Mannesmann, considered the largest corporate takeover in history. After joining Apax Partners in 2006, Mead joined the investment group of the Boston Celtics before co-founding Richmond Park Partners (RPP) in 2007.

A photographer, his prints have been included in the Royal Academy Summer Exhibition every year since 2011. BBC's Culture Show profiled his work in 2012, and Mead published his aerial photography and philosophy book Above the Clouds in October 2017.

Founder and chairman of the philanthropic Mead Family Foundation, Mead is involved with organizations such as the Tate Foundation, the International Center of Photography, the University of the Arts, The Photographers' Gallery, and the Women's Tennis Association (WTA). He has also supported programs at educational institutions such as Phillips Academy, Cambridge University, Harvard University, and University of Pennsylvania Law School.

Early life and education
Scott Mead was born in Washington, DC. His father, James M. Mead, was a businessperson. With extended family based out of Erie, Pennsylvania during his youth, Mead's grandfather John J. Mead Jr. had been a press journalist and photographer for the Erie Times-News, founded and owned by the Mead family. After accompanying his grandfather on assignments as a small child, Mead picked up photography after he was given one of his grandfather's cameras at age thirteen. Mead taught himself how to develop photographs in his parents' basement. He attended high school at Phillips Academy in Andover, Massachusetts, graduating in 1973. In 1974 he began attending Harvard College. At Harvard he majored in American history and literature, also focusing on the visual arts under professors such as William Eggleston. Mead graduated cum laude with a Bachelor of Arts (BA) degree in 1977. After receiving the Harvard Scholar award that year to attend Cambridge University, in 1979 he graduated Cambridge's Emmanuel College with a Master of Philosophy. Mead subsequently received a J.D. from the University of Pennsylvania law school in 1982.

Business career

1980s-2003: Goldman Sachs
Early in his career Mead worked at First Boston Corporation and moved to Goldman Sachs in New York in 1986 as vice president in their corporate finance department, before being transferred to London in 1988, where he became a Goldman Sachs managing director and later partner. At Goldman Sachs he soon took on the roles of chairman of the global telecoms, media, entertainment and technology group and the head of European Privatizations, advising several major deals. In 1999 he was Goldman Sachs'  chief negotiator and advisor for Vodafone's takeover of the German telecom group Mannesmann. The value of the acquisition neared $200 billion, considered the largest in history. He also advised Vodafone on its $66.5 billion takeover of Airtouch Communications. During his time with Goldman Sachs, he oversaw mergers and transactions totaling approximately $500 billion. After retiring as a partner and managing director from Goldman Sachs in 2003, he ran and managed his own private equity activities, advised a group of "blue-chip" companies, and focused on philanthropy.

2006-present: Apax and RPP
Mead joined a group of investors around 2006 who had purchased the Boston Celtics. After management made substantial investment in new talent and coaching, in 2008 the team won the NBA play-offs. From October 2006 until September 2008 Mead was a senior advisor at Apax Partners, serving as chairman of the company's global technology and telecommunications advisory board.

In 2007 Mead co-founded Richmond Park Partners (RPP) in London, taking on the role of president.  The company initially focused on financial services and telecom clients in Europe and the Middle East.  Since 2012 he has devoted much of his time to photography.

Arts career 
Mead minored in visual studies at Harvard, studying under photographers such as William Eggleston and Emmet Gowin in the mid 1970s. Among other projects, around this time he "used a complex photography technique to shoot a series of black and white photographs capturing rural New England" circular format. In 2009, Mead rediscovered old prints and negatives from his student years in his attic, and began re-immersing himself in photography.
 
In 2010, 25 of Mead's images from 1974 to 1977, many of them never printed before, were displayed at a London solo exhibition titled Looking Back at Mayfair gallery Hamilton's, with all funds donated to Great Ormond Street Hospital in London. Prints from the exhibit and other works were afterward selected for inclusion in the 2011 Royal Academy Summer Exhibition, and Mead also had prints selected for the Royal Academy summer exhibition in 2012, 2013, 2014, 2015, 2016, and 2017. In 2012 the BBC Culture Show program profiled his work, and Mead published the book Looking Back afterwards, featuring prints from his twenties. In October 2017 the aerial photography and philosophy book Above the Clouds was published by Prestel, with prints from the book exhibited in January 2018 at Hamiltons.

Boards and philanthropy 
Mead created The Mead Family Foundation in 1996, also assuming the role of chairman. After Great Ormond Street Hospital in London cured his infant child of leukaemia, Mead became a long-term supporter and board member of the institution. He has also endowed the Great Ormond Street Hospital's GOSH Arts program, where patients are immersed in the arts during often difficult treatments, potentially resulting in a more positive outcome. Mead has also been on the board of visitors of MD Anderson Cancer Center in Houston, Texas.

Mead has spearheaded a number of educational initiatives, and he backed and co-founded London’s Notting Hill Preparatory school in 2003. He has been a board member of Usher's New Look Foundation, which provides training and mentorship to disadvantaged children, and he joined the UK advisory board of Room to Read in 2009. He remains involved in all of his alma maters, including Phillips Academy, Emmanuel College, Cambridge University, and Harvard University. Mead founded the Mead International Fellows Program, and in 2008 he established the "Scott Mead '77 Family Head Coach" endowment to support the Harvard Men's Tennis team. A benefactor fellow at Emmanuel College, he was the creator and benefactor of the University of the Arts London's Mead Fellowships, which provides grants to students in the arts. He is also the creator of the Mead Fellowship at University of Pennsylvania Law School.

He is also involved in various athletic and arts organizations. He joined the executive committee for the Tate Foundation, and is on the Tate's acquisition committee. Also on the global advisory council of the Women's Tennis Association (WTA), he has also been a member of the trustees of Queens Club. Since 2011 he has been a trustee of the International Center of Photography in New York,  and he joined the rector's council of the University of the Arts London in 2012, and its court of governors in 2017. Furthermore, he was chairman of the board of trustees of The Photographers' Gallery in London from 2013 until 2016.

Selected exhibitions
2010: Looking Back - Solo exhibition / Hamilton’s Gallery, London - 25 of Mead's prints  from 1974 to 1977 were exhibited.
2010-2011: The PhotoVoice Auction of Exceptional Photographs - Group show - Mead's print “Three Barns” and “Untitled” exhibited and sold as part of the auction to benefit PhotoVoice.
2011-2012: The Art Show - Group show / Park Avenue Armory, New York - His print “Evening Light” was exhibited, followed by "Untitled (Umbrellas on Beach)," with the show organized by the Art Dealers Association of America to benefit Henry Street Settlement.
2011-2017: Summer Exhibition - Group show / Royal Academy of Arts, London - various photograph prints selected, most recently "Journey into Blue" and "Autumn.”
2018: Scott Mead: Above the Clouds - Solo exhibition / Hamilton’s Gallery, London - several prints

Books
 2010: Looking Back by Scott Mead (self-published 1st edition) 
2017: Above the Clouds by Scott Mead (Prestel)

See also
List of former employees of Goldman Sachs

References

External links 
 

Goldman Sachs people
Fine art photographers
Year of birth missing (living people)
Living people
Harvard University alumni
Phillips Academy alumni
University of Pennsylvania Law School alumni